How Shall I Tell My Husband? is a 1932 German comedy film directed by Reinhold Schünzel and starring Renate Müller, Georg Alexander, and Ida Wüst. It was shot at the Babelsberg and Tempelhof Studios in Berlin. The film's sets were designed by the art director Werner Schlichting. Location filming took place at Heringsdorf on the Baltic Sea. It premiered at the Gloria-Palast in Berlin.

Cast

References

Bibliography

External links

1932 films
1932 comedy films
German comedy films
Films of the Weimar Republic
1930s German-language films
Films directed by Reinhold Schünzel
UFA GmbH films
German black-and-white films
1930s German films
Films shot at Babelsberg Studios
Films shot at Tempelhof Studios